The Symphony No. 3, Op. 63 by Malcolm Arnold was finished in 1957. It is in three movements:

I. Allegro – Vivace
II. Lento
III. Allegro con brio – Presto – Lento e maestoso – Presto

The work was commissioned by the Royal Liverpool Philharmonic Society. The first performance was given by John Pritchard conducting the Royal Liverpool Philharmonic on 2 December 1957 at the Royal Festival Hall.

Commercial recordings
1959  Malcolm Arnold and the London Philharmonic Orchestra on Everest Records SDBR 3021 (re-released on Everest 9001) 
1994 Richard Hickox and the London Symphony Orchestra on Chandos Records CHAN 9290 
1996 Vernon Handley and the Royal Liverpool Philharmonic on Conifer Records 75605-51258-2 (re-released on Decca 4765337) 
1998 Andrew Penny and the RTÉ National Symphony Orchestra on Naxos Records 8.553739 (recorded 13–14 June 1996, in the presence of the composer)

References
Chester-Novello page on the Symphony

Symphony No. 3
1957 compositions